These hits topped the Ultratop 50 in the Flanders region of Belgium in 1990.

See also
1990 in music

References

1990 in Belgium
1990 record charts
1990